Palau Municipal d'Esports de Badalona (also known as the Pavelló Olímpic de Badalona) is an arena in the Gorg area of Badalona, Catalonia, Spain. The arena holds 12,760 people, and it is primarily used for basketball, though it is also an habitual home for music concerts and other municipal events.

History
Built in 1991, it was opened in 1992 with a basketball game between Catalonia and Croatia; where Croatians won by 118-82 led with 30 points of Toni Kukoč and 21 point of Dražen Petrović.

The arena hosted the basketball tournament of the 1992 Summer Olympics, the 1992 Olympic Basketball Tournament. It was designed by the architects Esteve Bonell and Francesc Rius, who won the 1992 European Union Prize for Contemporary Architecture for this building.

It is also the home arena of Joventut de Badalona, one of the most important professional basketball squads in Spain. Before the Pavelló Olímpic was built, the now 3,300 capacity Pavelló Club Joventut Badalona hosted the city basketball games and most of the other indoor sports.

Transport
The closest Barcelona Metro station is Gorg, on lines L2 and L10. It is also served by trams belonging to the Trambesòs system.

See also
 List of indoor arenas in Spain

References

External links

1992 Summer Olympics official report.  Volume 2. pp. 276–9.

Indoor arenas in Catalonia
Joventut Badalona
Basketball venues in Spain
Venues of the 1992 Summer Olympics
Olympic basketball venues
Buildings and structures in Badalona
Sport in Badalona